Gagarinskaya is a station of the Samara Metro on First Line which was opened on 26 December 1993.

References

Samara Metro stations
Railway stations in Russia opened in 1993
Railway stations located underground in Russia